William Bond was born in London, England in 1946. When he was four years old, his parents immigrated to Australia and lived in the state of Western Australia. In 1970, he returned to England, and has lived there ever since.

He has been writing since the late 1980s, and has written numerous published books, blog articles, and YouTube videos about several diverse topics, including philosophy, politics, economics, diet and nutrition, and even mermaids.  But he is most well known for his writings on the topic of matriarchy along with matriarchal religion and spirituality, for which he is a strong advocate.
  His early inspirations in that regard included authors Elizabeth Gould Davis, Merlin Stone, and Marija Gimbutas since the 1970s.

William has been known to collaborate with fellow matriarchist author Rasa von Werder (also known as Kellie Everts) since 2004, and has also collaborated with author Pamela Suffield to a lesser extent since his first published book (with Suffield as co-author) in 1994, Gospel of the Goddess: A Return to God the Mother, which they began writing in the late 1980s and self-published it in the early 1990s.

Bibliography

Also featured in:

Woman, Thou Art God: The New Religion for Women, by Rasa Von Werder (2020)
It's Not Over Till The Fat Lady Sings: Mother God Strikes Back Against Misogyny, by Rasa Von Werder (2007)

See also
Matriarchy
Matriarchal religion
Goddess Movement
Feminist spirituality
Rasa von Werder

References

Living people
1946 births
People from London
English male non-fiction writers
21st-century English male writers
21st-century English non-fiction writers
English religious writers